Royalty rate assessment is a practical tool to gauge the impact of a royalty commitment in a technology contract to the business interests of the contracting parties. In this coverage, the terms  'royalty', 'royalty rate' and 'royalties' are used interchangeably.

A firm with valuable Intellectual Property IP by having spent sums of money to develop manufacturing know-how, patents or a trademark, can be expected to not only employ it for gain but to seek, by licensing it out: (a) to recoup part of the expenditure incurred on development (b) achieve such in the shortest period of time and (c) attempt to obtain a profit from each of the markets in which the IP will be employed to the gain of the licensee.

A licensee under the IP, on the other hand, risks (a) the potential loss of capital that would be invested for working the license (b) the adequacy and protection in the rights licensed and (c) and the uncertainties of any marketplace.  The licensee's objective would, thus, be to minimize exposure to the costs and  the performance of the technology.

This contest in objectives will normally be settled by a compromise of expectations. One of the key elements of this  process is the royalty applied,  amplified here. The royalty is not a single separate element but is a composite of the rate, the length of time over which it applies, the unit base of its calculation, the 'remaining life' of the licensed right (for instance, the balance life of a patent), supportive assistance and other contractual obligations. Other license metrics, such  as exclusionary rights modify the rate.

But fundamental to this exercise, to both the parties do a contract, is the competitiveness of the product, process, service or like entity. If there are rival products or services available to the licensee, or if there are more favourable markets for the licensor, the compromising equation changes in context.

The cost to the licensor in developing a technology, or the cost of building the value of a trademark or the normal market risks of the licensee in the choice of product, and concomitant capital costs, are not generally part of the compromise equation, significant as these factors may be to each of the negotiating parties. However,  such costs do become pertinent when a technology is licensed out prior to its maturity (See The Technology Life Cycle).

Typical royalty rates

'Typical royalties' are historically applied royalty rates. To understand the concept of 'typical royalties' one must infer that the term 'royalty' originally applied to the 'share of the proceeds' that the Crown  demanded of its subjects for any exploitation of the assets owned by the Crown, for instance, mines, shipping lanes, geographic territories and the like. Besides the implication of sharing the proceeds of an operation, the payment of royalty was expressly an acknowledgement that the exploited property remained in the hands of the Crown; in other words, any exploitation was by a way of lease or franchise and not through sharing or transfer of ownership. Today this concept carries over to the absolute ownership of property in Intellectual Property rights (IPR), whether that resides in a product, process or system by a governmental, corporation or like entity.

Where there is lack of knowledge of the analytical concepts in royalty, the general tendency is to use mineral mining royalties as a base reference. Historically, royalties in the region of 1.0 to 3.0% have prevailed, the unit-base being 'sales value' of the exploited product. Little consideration is given to the character of the product or process being licensed, the nature and profitability of the market-place or the 'remaining life' of the licensed entity. In a slightly modified form, typical rates applied in the industry to which the product belongs is used; for instance, in the textiles, chemicals  or auto-component industries.

As will be seen shortly, such arbitrary negotiation of royalty rates holds danger for both the proprietor/licensor of technology and its user/licensee. In a poorly profitable market, the licensee stands to lose disproptionately, and in a very profitable market, the licensor.

Royalty rate as profit share

To start with, a very simple illustration is provided to describe  the profit-sharing concept, which will be expanded upon subsequently. (See Guidelines for Evaluation of Transfer of Technology Agreements, United Nations, New York, 1979, pp 40).

Any enterprise marketing a product would expect to obtain a profit which is some percentage of its sales price. If the product arises from working a license, then its licensor  would want to share a part of that profit. (The licensed product can be expected to command a higher price in the market-place than its competitor by virtue of higher yield, lower cost, better quality,  convenience or other factors). In the discussion below, the royalty term that is illustrated is 'royalty on sales' with the sale involving one unit of product. (Other forms of royalty are discussed later).

Arithmetically, royalty (on sales) can be expressed as:

Royalty = Payment-to-licensor/Product-sales-price

or re-expressed as

Royalty = Licensor-profit/Product-sales-price

or as

Royalty = Licensor-profit/Enterprise-profit x Enterprise-profit/Product-sales-price

or more formally as

   ROS = LSEP x POS    (A)

where:

ROS  = Royalty on Sales price
LSEP = Licensor's Share of Enterprise Profit
POS  = Profit on Sales (price)

Thus, if a licensor wants to receive a 30% share of the enterprise's (licensee's) profit (LSEP) on a product that sells for $5, and on which the licensor estimates the licensee's profit on sale (POS) would be $1.50 or 30% (POS=$1.5/$5.0=30%), the licensor would negotiate to apply a royalty rate (ROS) of 9% on the sales price (LSEP=30% of $1.50 or $0.45; $0.45/$5=9%).

(The terms 'price' and 'profit' as used here are undefined; they will receive greater precision in later discussion).

Expression (A) above can be re-expressed as:

      LSEP = ROS/POS      (B) or in the example: 30% = 9%/30%

It exhibits an important facet of the royalty rate concept. For a given royalty rate (i.e. ROS), the  licensor obtains a greater percentage of the profit on the product the lower the profitability of the product (and, vice versa, the enterprise gives away a smaller share of the profit to the licensor for a product of high profitability).

It is important to differentiate between the percentage share of the licensor in the profit from the percentage royalty rate which is its most common form of statement.

Royalty rate and the technology turnover concept

A more elegant - and algebraic - way of looking at royalty payments is to attempt some form of consolidation of the quantitative variables in a licensing proposal (See Manual on Technology Transfer Negotiation, United Nations Industrial Development Organization, Vienna, Austria, 1996  pp.256, 1996).

Table A demonstrates one form of consolidation.

It takes the case of a technology license where the royalty rate is 4% on  sales value over 5 years, with rights to the licensee to continue operations beyond that period without further payment obligations.  For purposes of illustration, it is assumed that the annual sales volume and  production cost are constant (later discussion allows for year-to-year changes):

{| class="wikitable"
|+ Table A. Schematic of Incomes and   Cost Flows
|                    Unit:'$000
|-
|  Year
!  1
!  2
!  3-5
!  6
|-
|  Sales
!  100
!  100
!  100 
!  100
|-
|  Cost of Production
!  40
!  40
!  40
!  40 
|-
|  Royalty Due,R
!  4
!  4
!  4
!  0 
|-
| Total Cost
!  44
!  44
!  44
!  40 
|-
|  Operating Profit OPR
!  56
!  56
!  56
!  60  OP
|}

It is evident that in the 6th year, the  Operating Profit of the enterprise increases by $4000.

The higher value of the Operating Profit in the 6th year would not be apparent if assessment was limited to the first 5 years of royalty commitment.

Algebraically,

  LSEP = R/(OPR+R)   - C

where:
LSEP is the licensor's share of  licensee's profit (see Expression A above)
 R is the absolute amount of royalty paid
OPR is the profit-before-tax during the royalty-applicable period 

Expression C can be rewritten as:

  LSEP = 1/ (1 + OPR/R) - D

or as

  LSEP = 1 / (1+TTF)     - E

where TTF is defined as the Technology Turnover Factor. It is a measure of the profit or return that the enterprise obtains for a unit of royalty payment - the profit accelerator. A high TTF implies a lower share of enterprise profit flows to the licensor (and conversely, a higher share to the licensor when the TTF is small). The evaluation of Expression E and that of TTF provide estimates  of commitments to the technology-offering party  in accepting a license at a particular royalty rate (and a base for negotiations).

Expression C also defines the term 'profit' for this analysis; it is the profit before tax during the royalty-bearing period and not that of the post-royalty period. Thus, taxation rates do not come into play and it is possible to evaluate the impact of royalties independent of territory.

Of course, in normal business practice, royalty rates take on different forms, while sales, costs and profits vary from year to year. Unless they can be consolidated to single numbers, the practical use of Expressions (D) and (E) would not be feasible. This can be done by converting all cash flows to their 'Present Value'.

The 'Present Value' method of capitalizing flows

The concept of Present Value is routinely used in financial analysis of projects to make a selection where there are alternative financing modalities or to assess incomes/expenditures in the context of different risk projections. Its objective is to capitalize variously distributed incomes and costs by 'discounting' them  to their 'present value' (PV). That is, an income at a future date has a lower certainty than an immediate income by its assumed rate of risk.

If $0.9091 is banked today at an interest rate of 10%, its value at the end of a year would be $1.00. Conversely, $1.00  received (or spent) one year from now is equivalent to its Present Value of $0.9091. It is said that the discounted value of $1.00 one year from now is equal to $0.9091 at a  discount rate of 10%. Similarly, $0.8264 is the PV of $1.00 receivable two years from today at the 10% rate.

The  term 'interest rate' used above is an approximation for the economist's discount rate (see below) . It is not the inflation rate or the bank rate but the latter are parts of it.

The discount factors (DF) of 0.9091,0.8264, etc. are generated from the 'compound interest' formula:

DF = 1/ (1+ r)n

where

 r is the discount rate 
 n is the forward year from current day = 0

It then becomes possible to reformulate a stream of profits and royalties to their PVs. The sum of PVs results in the Net Present Value (NPV).

Only OPR and R for each year are needed  to obtain LSEP and TTF.

Table B illustrates this methodology for evaluating the projected LSEP of an enterprise, where royalty has been made applicable for a period of 5 years. The discount rate applied is 10%.

{| class="wikitable"
|+ Table B. Illustrative Projected Flows of OP and Royalty of an Enterprise [Unit:$000]

|  Year -->
!  1
!  2
!  3
!  4
!  5
|-
|  Sales
!  700
!  900
!  1200
!  1600
!  2200
|- 
|  OPR
!  75
!  105
!  130
!  200
!  280
|-
|  Royalty
!  60
!  36
!  48
!  64
!  88
|-
|  Discount Factor,10%
!  0.9091
!  0.8264
!  0.7531
!  0.6830
!  0.6209
|-
|  Discounted OPR
!  68.2
!  86.8
!  97.7
!  136.6
!  173.9
|-
|  Discounted R
!  54.5
!  29.8
!  36.1
!  43.7
!  54.6
|}

The NPVs of OPR and R are $563,100 and $218,700,respectively, and thus, the projected LSEP is 0.28 i.e. the licensee shares 28% of the profits of the enterprise with the licensor over the five-year period. Profit projection data is made by the licensee and would not be generally known to the licensor, and thus, the asking royalty of 4% on sales becomes the licensor's bench-mark for negotiation.

The sales value data shown in the table is not relevant to the calculation of LSEP. It is, however, an estimation the licensor would need to know or make  to evolve a suitable royalty rate. A 4% royalty on sales value for a 5-year period of the license, together with a lump-sum payment of $32000 (risk-free income) on execution of the license is then the 'asking price' in the example.

The TTF of this projection is 2.6, implying that for every dollar of royalty paid, the OP to the licensee enterprise is multiplied by this factor.

Normal project calculations look beyond the royalty-bearing period evaluating both the NPV and the <IRR> Internal rate of return of the enterprise.

The discount rate

The 'discount rate' used in capitalization of flows estimates the element of accepting risk in the projection of costs and incomes. Without risk, the future income is a  certainty. In a live environment, risks arise from  unexpected competition, infringement, invalidation and loss of trade secrets, political and economic risks, etc. This affects both parties to the contract. In the presence of such risks, discount rates are higher than the bank interest rate and are based on the expected Beta coefficient - the dependence of a risk in one aspect to the risk in another. With high discount rates, sales that occur far in the future have little effect on the expected incomes.

Typically, risk is assumed at 10%. Whether the actual risk  is higher or lower than this figure becomes a factor of the negotiation process; for instance, the seller of a technology may consider the risk of obsolescence low whereas the opposite party may consider it high.

Royalty rate expressions

Royalty  in licence agreements is always in consideration of something that is provided by the licensor to the licensee in the agreement, such as the right to use a trademark, patent, know-how, designs, drawings or a  combination of them.

Royalty payments take three basic forms:

 'running' royalties
 'lumpsum' royalty
  running royalties together with lump-sum royalties

Any payment should be related to:

 the specific entity of the license that bears the royalty
 the unit-base on which the royalty is applicable (e.g. per kilogram of product)
 the period over which payments are due
 when the payments have to be made, currency and transaction mode
 the mutual obligations of the licensor and licensee in relation to the entity.

For instance in a product licensing agreement, the  licensee may be called upon to pay a lumpsum royalty of $100,000 on execution of agreement together with royalty of 4% of the 'net sales value' for all licensed products for a period of 6 years, commencing 2 years from the date of starting production.

The selection of the royalty base should not be arbitrary. Each form of compensation has advantages and disadvantages to the contracting parties. What follows is a just an introduction.

Running Royalties

Running royalties are predominantly used in patent, trademark and franchise licensing since they can theoretically be exploited without any other inputs from the licensor once the license has been executed.

Where there is only one product, the royalty base can be either the number of units produced or sold (the distinction is significant) or the 'sales value' (sales realization) of the product. Where the term 'sales value' is the base unit, it has to be very strictly defined; whether it is the 'gross sales value' or 'net sales value' (NSV), and if the latter, what components of the price need to be subtracted (for instance, packing cost, sales taxes, transportation costs, etc.).  NSV is predominantly used when there are a multiplicity of products made or processed in some way (say, various thicknesses of plate glass in a glass-manufacturing license).

In some circumstances there may be minimum and maximum (cut-off) royalty stipulations. Minimum royalties are used when there is a possibility that the licensee may not work the license to its full benefit or is incorporated as an incentive to work the technology to the full. The maximum or cut-off royalty can be negotiated when the licensor agrees that a cumulative amount will satisfy the objectives of license; once the limit is reached, no further royalties become due. An alternative is the incorporation of reducing royalties if large volumes are expected in the future.

Lumpsum Royalties

Lumpsum royalties are most often encountered when the principal contribution of the licensor is providing formulae, documentation, designs and the like. That is, once the transmission of the latter is completed, the licensor has no involvement with the licensee so long as the caveats and rights of the license are respected. In some cases, the lumpsum merely represents the 'capitalization' (PV) of a part of the running royalties.

Combined Lumpsum and Running Royalties

This combination of royalties is met with in 'technology contracts' where more than one form of intellectual property is licensed out combined, possibly, with a knowhow license, and in many cases, with a straight knowhow license alone. 
 
Where the transfer of know-how is solely the province of contract, the lumpsum often works as 'insurance' against misuse of know-how by the licensee, since there is no protective statute for it (unlike with patents and trademarks), while the 'running royalty' can be insurance for the licensee in that the licensor would provide inputs so as to maximize income (thus to the benefit of both). Alternatively, the running payments may be to spread an otherwise lumpsum component.

Technical assistance fees

In many contracts involving the use of knowhow (and associated IP), 'technical assistance' may be encountered as a part of the contractual process, particularly in developing country contracts. The assistance comprises services which are not in the nature of IP but are needed by the licensee to accomplish its objectives. They are of a specialized nature linked to the knowhow, for instance, procurement of equipment, the setup of a production facility or training of licensee personnel, on-site and off-site. These costs would bear no relationship to the royalties, although they are most often provided by the licensor. ( See  *Licensing Guide For Developing Countries', World Intellectual Property Organization (WIPO), 1977, Section H).

The cost of such services arises from delineating the   skill-mix and 'man'-hours of effort involved (domestic and expatriate personnel) and providing for supervision overhead. The costs of different skills is in the public domain and can be readily estimated. The overhead percentage, however, is a negotiated element

References

Guidelines for Evaluation of Transfer of Technology Agreements, United Nations, New York, 1979.
Manual on Technology Transfer Negotiation, United Nations Industrial Development Organization, Vienna, Austria, 1996  (Modules 6 and 16), 1996.
Licensing Guide For Developing Countries', World Intellectual Property Organization (WIPO), 1977.

Licensing